Melitara junctolineella is a species of snout moth in the genus Melitara. It was described by George Duryea Hulst in 1900. It is found in southern Texas (from Brownsville to Presidio) and Mexico (along the coastal plain south from Texas to Tampico). The species has been introduced in Australia as a biological control agent of Opuntia stricta.

Adults are on wing from mid-January to May and again from late August to early November. There are two generations per year.

The larvae feed on Opuntia rufida, Opuntia macrorhiza var. macrorhiza, Opuntia stricta var. stricta and Opuntia lindheimeri var. lindheimeri. Larvae of the first generation are gregarious and bore into young cladodes of the host plant. Older larvae are solitary and feed on older cladodes, entering near the top and boring down through the center. The tunnel itself is filled with frass causing the stem to swell where injured. Pupation takes place in debris on the soil surface. Second-generation larvae feed during winter, and pupate in January.

References

Moths described in 1900
Phycitini